Diane Seuss (born 1956) is an American poet and educator. Her book frank: sonnets won the Pulitzer Prize for Poetry and the National Book Critics Circle Award for Poetry in 2022.

She was born in Michigan City, Indiana and grew up in Michigan in Edwardsburg and Niles. Seuss received a BA from Kalamazoo College and an MSW from Western Michigan University.

She taught at Kalamazoo College from 1988 until 2016. In 2012, she was the MacLean Distinguished Visiting Professor in the Department of English at Colorado College. She has been a visiting professor at the University of Michigan and Washington University in St. Louis.

Seuss is a 2020 Guggenheim Fellow. In 2021 she received the John Updike Award from the American Academy of Arts and Letters.

Her poetry has appeared in Gulf Coast, Missouri Review, Poetry, and The New Yorker, among others. Her book Four-Legged Girl was a finalist for the Pulitzer Prize. Still Life with Two Dead Peacocks and a Girl was a finalist for the National Book Critics Circle Award in Poetry and the Los Angeles Times Book Prize in Poetry.

Critical reception 
Reviews of Seuss's work often note her technical acumen. Writing about frank: sonnets in the Women's Review of Books, Laurie Stone notes "More than anything, it strikes me, she loves the individual sentence and line." Los Angeles Times reviewer Victoria Chang says that Seuss is "writing some of the most animated and complex poetry today," and goes on to writeIn an age where poetry can so easily be simplified into small one-dimensional sound bites to share on Instagram or Twitter, Seuss's poems aspire to complicate, drawing connections between seemingly unrelated things, flowing in and out and back and away from their initial triggers.Publishers Weekly called Seuss's writing "endlessly inventive with her language and feats of imagination."

Four-Legged Girl 
Seuss's third collection, Four Legged Girl, is "concerned with loss," including the deaths of her father and of a former lover, but also addresses "importance of living in the present," writes Marybeth Rua-Larsen. She goes on "In Four-Legged Girl, Seuss not only turns the common associations of flowers as gentle and delicate things easily damaged into symbols of strength and aggression but does so with energy, inventiveness, and a wildness that is incapable of being tamed."

In the American Poetry Review, Margaree Little addresses the collection's title, which refers to Myrtle Corbin, a Victorian-era person who was born with four legs, and who appears on the cover of the book. Seuss begins and ends the book with works taking inspiration from Corbin. Little writes that Seuss's poems are "borne of traumas" and sees Corbin as a mirror of Seuss's self-identification "as a spectacle, an exhibit, a performance."

Writing for The Rumpus, Ellen Mack-Miller notes a sense of animism in Four-Legged Girl, writing "Seuss animates. Objects come alive, like toys springing from a chest when darkness comes." Four Legged Girl was a finalist for a Pulitzer Prize; the nomination called the collection "a gallery of incisive and beguiling portraits and landscapes."

Still Life with Two Dead Peacocks and a Girl 
Seuss's collection 'Still Life with Two Dead Peacocks' takes its title from the Rembrandt painting of the same name, and each section of the collection begins with an image derived from the painting. Other poems references paintings Vincent van Gogh, Georgia O'Keefe, Mark Rothko, and Jackson Pollock among others. Reviewer Laurie Stone writes that the poems' use of painting allows them to "freeze time" and makes them a "lab for experiments with language, rough emotions, and the indeterminacy of feeling."  Los Angeles Times reviewer Victoria Chang describes the effect of Seuss's use of painting to frame her poems: "By the end of the book, we see how a painting (and the speaker's life) have become so much more because we have taken the painting (and life) apart and expanded each fragment.... art, in particular still life art, is anything but useless."

frank: sonnets 
frank: sonnets comprises 128 poems, all sonnets. Critic Laurie Stone sees Seuss's use of poetic form as a metaphor: "A sonnet is like a trapped body: all physical limits and nowhere to run but inside the lyrical imagination. Fourteen lines, again and again."

Critic Meryl Natchez writes that
... in frank: sonnets, [Seuss] provides fresh imagery, calls out the male icons of the '70s and early '80s New York scene, and directly grapples with loneliness, addiction, abortion, and death. The language is often startling, the incidents pried open for the reader to enter and observe. The overall arc of the book is memoir: stories of grief, of questing, of trying to make sense of a complex life. These poems appear in the order written, with long sequences about Seuss's father, her lovers, her exploits and failures, and the death of a close friend.

The Pulitzer Prize committee described frank: sonnets as "a virtuosic collection that inventively expands the sonnet form to confront the messy contradictions of contemporary America, including the beauty and the difficulty of working-class life in the Rust Belt."

Selected works 
 It Blows You Hollow (1998)
 Wolf Lake, White Gown Blown Open (2010), winner of the Juniper Prize for Poetry in 2009
 Four-Legged Girl (2015), finalist for the Pulitzer Prize for Poetry in 2016
 Still Life with Two Dead Peacocks and a Girl (2018), finalist for National Book Critics Circle Award for Poetry and Los Angeles Times Book Prize in Poetry.
 frank: sonnets (2021), winner of the PEN/Voelcker Award for Poetry Collection, the National Book Critics Circle Award for Poetry, and the Pulitzer Prize for Poetry

References 

1956 births
Living people
American women poets
Kalamazoo College alumni
Western Michigan University alumni
Kalamazoo College faculty
American women academics
21st-century American women
Pulitzer Prize for Poetry winners
University of Michigan faculty
Washington University in St. Louis faculty